This is an incomplete list of Statutory Instruments of the United Kingdom in 1957. This listing is the complete, 30 items, "Partial Dataset" as listed on www.legislation.gov.uk (as at March 2014).

Statutory Instruments
The Airways Corporations (General Stall, Pilots and Officers Pensions) (Amendment) Regulations, 1957 SI 1957/ 87
The Visiting Forces Act (Application to Colonies) (Amendment) Order, 1957 SI 1957/103
The Coal Industry (Superannuation Scheme) (Winding Up, No. 11) Regulations 1957 SI 1957/156
The Petroleum-Spirit (Conveyance by Road) Regulations 1957 SI 1957/191
The Coal Industry Nationalisation (Superannuation) Regulations 1957 SI 1957/319
The Wireless Telegraphy (Control of Interference from Ignition Apparatus) Amendment (No. 1) Regulations 1957 SI 1957/347
The Oil in Navigable Waters (Transfer Records) Regulations 1957 SI 1957/358
The Transferred Undertakings (Pensions of Employees) (Amendment) Regulations 1957 SI 1957/438
The National Health Service (Superannuation) (England and Scotland) (Amendment) Regulations 1957 SI 1957/788
The Petroleum (Liquid Methane) Order 1957 SI 1957/859
The Merchant Shipping (Registration of Federation of Nigeria Government Ships) Order 1957 SI 1957/861
The Motor Vehicles (Construction and Use) (Track Laying Vehicles) (Amendment) (No.2) Regulations 1957 SI 1957/972
The Superannuation (English Local Government and Northern Ireland Civil Service) Interchange Rules 1957 SI 1957/1155
The Landlord and Tenant (Notices) Regulations 1957 SI 1957/1157
The Consular Conventions (Income Tax) (Italian Republic) Order 1957 SI 1957/1368
The Consular Conventions (Income Tax) (Federal Republic of Germany), Order 1957 SI 1957/1369
The Merchant Shipping (Certificates of Competency as A.B.) (Barbados) Order, 1957 SI 1957/1371
The Agriculture (Ladders) Regulations 1957 SI 1957/1385
The Agriculture (Power Take-off) Regulations 1957 SI 1957/1386
The British Transport Commission (Male Wages Grades Pensions) (Amendment) Regulations 1957 SI 1957/1455
The Double Taxation Relief (Estate Duty) (Pakistan) Order 1957 SI 1957/1522
The Copyright (International Organisations) Order 1957 SI 1957/1524
The Superannuation (National Physical Laboratory and Civil Service) Transfer Rules 1957 SI 1957/1586
The Justices of the Peace Act, 1949 (Compensation) Regulations 1957 SI 1957/1681
The Superannuation (Roehampton Hospital and Civil Service) Transfer Rules 1957 SI 1957/1723
The National Insurance and Industrial Injuries (Israel) Order 1957 SI 1957/1879
The Superannuation (Wartime Social Survey and Civil Service) Transfer Rules 1957 SI 1957/1989
The Consular Conventions (Federal Republic of Germany) Order 1957 SI 1957/2052
The Consular Conventions (Italian Republic) Order 1957 SI 1957/2053
The Superannuation (English Local Government and Northern Ireland Health Service) Interchange Rules 1957 SI 1957/2197
The Census of Distribution (1958) (Restriction on Disclosure) Order, 1956 SI 1957/1860
The Greenwich Hospital School (Regulations) (Amendment) Order, 1956 SI 1957/1894
The Merchant Shipping (Certificates of Competency as A.B.) (New Zealand) Order 1956 SI 1957/1895
The Coal Mines (Cardox and Hydrox) Regulations 1956 SI 1957/1942
The Stratified Ironstone, Shale and Fireclay Mines (Explosives) Regulations 1956 SI 1957/1943
The Mines (Manner of Search for Smoking Materials) Order 1956 SI 1957/2016
The Visiting Forces (Designation) Order 1956 SI 1957/2041
The Visiting Forces (Military Courts-Martial) (Amendment) Order 1956 SI 1957/2043
The Visiting Forces (Royal New Zealand Air Force) (Amendment) Order 1956 SI 1957/2044
The Sheriffs' Fees (Amendment No. 2) Order 1956 SI 1957/2081

Unreferenced Listings
The following 4 items were previously listed on this article, however are unreferenced on the authorities site, included here for a "no loss" approach.
Dearne Valley Water Board Order 1957 SI 1957/1153
North East of Birmingham-Nottingham Trunk Road (Breedon-On-The-Hill Bypass) Order 1957 SI 1957/1829
Alkali, Works (Registration) Order 1957 SI 1957/2208
Mid-Wessex Water (No. 2) Order 1957 SI 1957/2233

References

External links
Legislation.gov.uk delivered by the UK National Archive
UK SI's on legislation.gov.uk
UK Draft SI's on legislation.gov.uk

See also
List of Statutory Instruments of the United Kingdom

Lists of Statutory Instruments of the United Kingdom
Statutory Instruments